Actinomycetoma is a chronic bacterial subcutaneous infection caused by Actinomyces that affect the skin and connective tissue. It is, therefore, a form of actinomycosis. Mycetoma is a broad term which includes actinomycetoma and eumycetoma under it. However, eumycetoma is caused by fungal infection in contrast to actinomycetoma that is caused by bacteria mostly anaerobic. The predominant site of infection is the foot and leg. Both actinomycetoma and eumycetoma show very similar clinical and radiological presentations. And both chronic infections are endemic in tropical countries.

References

Bacterial diseases